Stanley Ng Chau-pei (born February 1970) is a Hong Kong pro-Beijing politician and trade unionist and the incumbent President and former Chairman of the Hong Kong Federation of Trade Unions (HKFTU), the largest trade union in Hong Kong, and also a Hong Kong deputy to the National People's Congress. He is also as a member of the Legislative Council, representing the Hong Kong Island East constituency.

Biography
He was born in February 1970 of Fujianese origin.  He is a member of the Hong Kong Clerical and Professional Employees General Union and its President. Through the General Union he has become the core member of the Hong Kong Federation of Trade Unions (FTU) after he joined in 1997 and became the Chairman of the HKFTU. He is also a Hong Kong deputy to the National People's Congress and member of the Standing Committee of the Xiamen Chinese People's Political Consultative Conference.

In the 2006 Hong Kong Election Committee Subsector elections, he was elected through the Labour Subsector as the member of the HKFTU. The 800-member election committee was responsible for the 2007 Hong Kong Chief Executive election in which Beijing's favourite Donald Tsang won against Alan Leong from the pan-democracy camp.

He was appointed by the Hong Kong government to many public positions such as the Employee's Compensation Insurances Levies Management Board from 2013, the Labour Advisory Board from 2011, the Mandatory Provident Fund Schemes Appeal Board from 2012 to 2014, the Standard Working Hours Committee since 2013. He had also been a part-time member of the government's Central Policy Unit.

Ng was also one of initiators of the Alliance for Peace and Democracy, a counter political alliance orchestrated by Beijing against the Occupy Central with Love and Peace launched by the pan-democrats to pressure Beijing to implement genuine democracy. He organised the anti-"Occupy" rally on 17 August 2014.

In April 2018, he succeeded Lam Shuk-yee to be the President of the FTU with Vice President Wong Kwok replaced him as the Chairman.

Ng criticised the decision of Court of Final Appeal in September 2018 to free the group of 13 activists, who had each received jail sentences of up to 13 months from a lower court for unlawful assembly outside the Legislative Council Complex on 13 June 2014. "How could this be an act of loving and protecting young people? [The judges] are killing them!" Ng said as he accused the judges "sinners of society". Ng's remarks drew criticism from the pro-democrats, as well as Chief Executive Carrie Lam which said his comments as "unacceptable".

During the 2019–20 Hong Kong protests, Ng slammed Li Ka Shing with coarse Cantonese slang, depicted Li "cockroach" king in a post on social media. "Cockroach" is frequently being used by the police in Hong Kong as a slur for protestors.

In March 2021, Apple Daily reported that Ng had criticized RTHK, stating that it was skewed and unprofessional.

In February 2022, after the Witman Hung birthday party controversy, Ng defended Hung and said that "His awareness about the epidemic situation was not strong enough, but he has faced public criticisms over it, and I do not see why he should step down from the NPC".

References

1970 births
Living people
Delegates to the 12th National People's Congress from Hong Kong
Delegates to the 13th National People's Congress from Hong Kong
Delegates to the 14th National People's Congress from Hong Kong
HK LegCo Members 2022–2025
Hong Kong activists
Hong Kong Federation of Trade Unions
Hong Kong pro-Beijing politicians
Hong Kong trade unionists
Members of the Election Committee of Hong Kong, 2007–2012
Members of the Election Committee of Hong Kong, 2012–2017
Members of the Election Committee of Hong Kong, 2017–2021
Members of the Election Committee of Hong Kong, 2021–2026